This is a list of notable events in music that took place in the year 1991.

Specific locations
1991 in British music
1991 in Norwegian music

Specific genres
1991 in country music
1991 in heavy metal music
1991 in hip hop music
1991 in Latin music
1991 in jazz

Events

Summary
Although the year 1991 is the year that grunge music made its popular breakthrough, heavy metal was still the dominant form of rock music for the year. Therefore, Nirvana's Nevermind, led by the surprise hit single "Smells Like Teen Spirit", was not the most popular U.S. album of the year. The most popular album was Metallica's self-titled "black album". Nirvana's success was eventually followed by other grunge bands like Pearl Jam, Soundgarden, Alice in Chains, and Stone Temple Pilots, as grunge climbed the U.S. charts for the next few years. Its success eventually ended the reign of the glam metal and other hard rock groups that enjoyed massive success in the 1980s like Mötley Crüe, Poison, Warrant, Cinderella, and Ratt, whose sales were still going strong by 1991. Also during the year, the rock band Guns N' Roses's popularity flourished with the release of their albums Use Your Illusion I & Use Your Illusion II, both selling over 15 million copies total. Def Leppard's next album Adrenalize, released in March 1992, would go on to reach multi-platinum status and prove to be the last major commercial success for 1980s hair metal. A Tribe Called Quest's Low End Theory is released this year; it would go on to be considered one of the best hip hop albums of the 1990s. A Tribe Called Quest, along with De La Soul, Dream Warriors, Gang Starr and the Poor Righteous Teachers, help define what comes to be known as alternative rap with important releases this year.

On November 24, Queen front man Freddie Mercury died at home in London due to AIDS complications. Rumors had been circulating that Mercury had AIDS and he confirmed it to the press a day before his death, but the death comes as a shock to millions of fans and the music industry. The remaining members of Queen form the Mercury Phoenix Trust and the following year, a tribute concert is staged in Wembley Stadium. A sell-out crowd in attendance witness the three surviving members reuniting to play along with performances by the likes of David Bowie, Elton John, Guns N' Roses, Def Leppard, Metallica, Annie Lennox, and George Michael.

Queen's "Bohemian Rhapsody" (released as a double A-side with "These Are the Days of Our Lives") goes to number one for the second time in the U.K., which is one of the few times a single has gone to number one in the same version more than once (another example is Chubby Checkers' "The Twist," which was No. 1 in 1960 & 1962). It is also the only time a single has gone to number one more than once on the UK Christmas charts. It has now spent a total of 14 weeks on top of the UK charts.

During the year, Billboard started using Nielsen SoundScan for its sales source for the music charts. Nielsen SoundScan began tracking sales data for Nielsen on 1 March 1991. The 25 May issue of Billboard published Billboard 200 and Country Album charts based on SoundScan "piece count data," and the first Hot 100 chart to debut with the system was released on 30 November 1991. Previously, Billboard tracked sales by calling stores across the U.S. and asking about sales – a method that was inherently error-prone and open to outright fraud. Indeed, while transitioning from the calling to tracking methods, the airplay and sales charts (already monitored by Nielsen) and the Hot 100 (then still using the calling system) often did not match (for instance Paula Abdul's "Promise of a New Day" and Roxette's "Fading Like a Flower" reached much higher Hot 100 peaks than their actual sales and airplay would have allowed them to). Although most record company executives conceded that the new method was far more accurate than the old, the chart's volatility and its geographical balance initially caused deep concern, before the change and the market shifts it brought about were accepted across the industry. Tower Records, the country's second-largest retail chain, was originally not included in the sample because its stores are equipped with different technology to measure sales. At first, some industry executives complained that the new system – which relied on high-tech sales measurement rather than store employee estimates – was based on an inadequate sample, one that favored established and mainstream acts over newcomers.

1991 is also the year CCM, or contemporary Christian music, reaches a new peak. Amy Grant, who had already crossed back and forth between CCM and Contemporary Pop in the mid-80s, achieves her first solo No. 1 hit on the pop charts with the hit single "Baby Baby," becoming the first single by a CCM artist to reach No. 1 (despite the fact the song was a pop song and was void of any Christian references). Another single, "That's What Love Is For," would also top the charts, this time in the Adult Contemporary field. Meanwhile, Grant's album Heart In Motion reaches No. 11 on the pop chart and No. 1 on the Christian chart despite its non-religious objective, and quickly becomes a best-seller. Another CCM crossover artist in 1991 is Michael W. Smith, who achieves a Top Ten pop hit with his single "Place In This World." The subsequent album, Go West Young Man, is also a hit. Jon Gibson's hit "Jesus Loves Ya" still holds the record as the longest playing hit single in Christian music history. The track spent eleven weeks at No. 1 and became the top selling CCM single of 1991. Only three artists received more airplay on Christian radio stations in that year other than Gibson; Amy Grant, Michael W. Smith and BeBe & CeCe Winans.

The massive success of Garth Brooks in this year sets the stage for the mid-1990s influx of pop-oriented country musicians. In addition, several soon-to-be pivotal bands form or release debuts, including Dave Matthews Band, Live, Phish, Spin Doctors and stoner metal (Kyuss, Sleep, The Obsessed). Massive Attack's Blue Lines, while unique at the time, pioneers the sound that would eventually become known as trip hop. Entombed's Clandestine and Dismember's Like an Ever Flowing Stream are early releases from the Scandinavian metal scene. On the other side of the Atlantic, New York death metal band Suffocation release their debut full-length Effigy of the Forgotten, often considered one of the most influential extreme metal albums ever recorded. Trance music rises to prominence in the underground dance scene of Frankfurt, Germany, pioneered by such producers as Dance 2 Trance and Resistance D. U2 release their seventh album Achtung Baby, considered by many of their fans to be their best album. Metallica also release their most commercially successful self-titled album, and the Red Hot Chili Peppers break through to the mainstream with their critically and commercially acclaimed Blood Sugar Sex Magik. R.E.M. release their massive commercial breakthrough album Out of Time. 1991 also brought us the revolutionary Sailing the Seas of Cheese, the first release of a Primus album on a major label. When it came to music, 1991 was one of the most successful years of the 1990s.

January–March
15 January – A new all-star rendition of the John Lennon song "Give Peace a Chance" is released, featuring Yoko Ono, Lenny Kravitz, Peter Gabriel, Alannah Myles, Tom Petty, Bonnie Raitt and many more, billed as "The Peace Choir". The single has been rushed to market in response to the imminent Gulf War.
16 January – The sixth annual Rock and Roll Hall of Fame induction ceremony is held in New York. The event goes forward despite a tense atmosphere due to the President's announcement of the Gulf War the same evening. The inductees are Ike & Tina Turner, Jimmy Reed, John Lee Hooker, LaVern Baker, The Byrds, The Impressions, Wilson Pickett and Howlin' Wolf.
18 January – Three people are crushed to death during an AC/DC concert in Salt Lake City, Utah, when audience members rush the stage.
18–27 January – The massive nine-day festival Rock in Rio II is held in Rio de Janeiro, Brazil. The headliners are a-ha, Prince, INXS, Guns N' Roses, New Kids on the Block, George Michael and Happy Mondays.
19 January  – Janet Jackson with seventh single from Janet Jackson's Rhythm Nation 1814, "Love Will Never Do (Without You)", making her the only artist to have seven singles from the same album chart in the top five.
27 January – Whitney Houston sings "The Star-Spangled Banner" at the Super Bowl. The recording is then released and becomes a hit single.
31 January – DJ Magazine is founded.
5 February – Queen release their final album while Freddie Mercury is still alive, entitled Innuendo. This album includes hit singles such as "The Show Must Go On", "Headlong", "These Are The Days Of Our Lives" and "Innuendo".
20 February – The 33rd Annual Grammy Awards are presented in New York, hosted by Garry Shandling. Quincy Jones' Back on the Block wins Album of the Year, Phil Collins' "Another Day in Paradise" wins Record of the Year and Bette Midler's version of "From a Distance" wins Song of the Year. Mariah Carey wins Best New Artist.
27 February – James Brown is granted an early parole and released from jail, following his arrest after a high-speed car chase through two states in 1989. Pop Will Eat Itself documented the affair with their song, "Not Now James, We're Busy".
28 February – Hollywood's Record Plant Studios recording studio closes down. Among the albums recorded at the Record Plant were The Eagles' Hotel California, Fleetwood Mac's Rumours and Stevie Wonder's Songs in the Key of Life.
1 March – Nielsen SoundScan began tracking sales data for Nielsen.
11 March – Janet Jackson signs a US$30 million contract with Virgin Records, making her the highest paid female recording artist ever.
12 March – R.E.M. release their seventh studio album, Out of Time. The album would serve as the band's breakthrough, catapulting the Georgia alternative rock band from cult status to a massive international act.
16 March – Seven members of country music singer Reba McEntire's band and her road manager are killed when their private plane crashes in California, near the U.S.-Mexico border. McEntire travels on a separate plane. The disaster inspires the title song of her next album, For My Broken Heart.
20 March
Michael Jackson signs a contract with Sony for 1 billion dollars.
Eric Clapton's four-year-old son, Conor, dies after falling 49 stories from a New York City apartment window, which would inspire Clapton to write the hit single "Tears in Heaven".
24 March – The Black Crowes are dropped as the opening act of ZZ Top's tour for repeatedly insulting the tour's sponsor, Miller Beer.
27 March – New Kids on the Block star Donnie Wahlberg is arrested in Louisville, Kentucky for allegedly setting his hotel room on fire.
28 March – George Harrison, Phil Collins and others attend funeral services for Eric Clapton's late son, Conor.

April–June
17 April – Nirvana performs "Smells Like Teen Spirit" live for the first time at the OK Hotel in Seattle, Washington.
28 April – Bonnie Raitt marries actor Michael O'Keefe in New York.
4 May – The Eurovision Song Contest 1991 is held in Rome, Italy and, after a highly controversial voting segment, Sweden's Fångad av en stormvind by Carola is declared the winner.
7 May – In Macon, Georgia, a judge dismisses a wrongful death lawsuit against Ozzy Osbourne. The suit was filed by a local couple that believed their son was inspired to attempt suicide by Osbourne's music.
10 May – Truth or Dare, a documentary chronicling singer Madonna's 1990 Blond Ambition Tour, is released to theatres.
24 May – Guns N' Roses kick off their 26-month world Use Your Illusion Tour in Alpine Valley in East Troy.
25 May – The Billboard 200 album chart starts incorporating electronically monitored sales data provided by Nielsen SoundScan, thus beginning what chart aficionados tag as the "SoundScan era".
28 May – The Smashing Pumpkins releases their debut album Gish, establishing the band as one of the most important of the alternative scene.
7 June – ABC revives the late-night rock performance series In Concert.
21 June – The Mérida State Symphony Orchestra is founded in Venezuela.
28 June – Paul McCartney's classical composition, the Liverpool Oratorio, receives its première at the Liverpool Anglican Cathedral.

July–September
2 July 
Launch of the Australian Festival of Chamber Music.
Hollywood Bowl Orchestra gives its first public performance.
During the Use Your Illusion Tour, Axl Rose assaults a member of the audience watching the show on camera, after security fails to respond to the singer's orders to confiscate the camera. After the attack, Rose angrily says, "Thanks to the lame-ass security, I'm goin' home!" and storms off the stage.
13 July – Pianist Keith Jarrett records his Vienna Concert at the Vienna Staatsoper.
18 July – Perry Farrell launches the first Lollapalooza tour as a farewell for his just-dissolved band, Jane's Addiction. Other acts appearing on the tour include Siouxsie and the Banshees, Nine Inch Nails, Rollins Band, Fishbone and Rage Against the Machine.
12 August – Metallica releases their most successful album, Metallica (also called "The Black Album"). Something of a departure from the thrash metal sound they helped pioneer, it becomes one of the best-selling albums of all time
13 August – Jermaine Jackson's "Word To The Badd!!" reaches #78 on the Billboard Hot 100
15 August – Paul Simon's Concert in the Park takes place in Central Park. The free concert is broadcast live on HBO.
20 August – The six-day International Pop Underground Convention opens in Olympia, Washington.
27 August
Pearl Jam release their debut album, Ten. While initially slow to sell, it becomes No. 2 on the Billboard charts within a year and has since become certified thirteen times Platinum in the United States.
Dr. Dre pleads no contest to charges that he beat up a woman at a West Hollywood nightclub. Dr. Dre is sentenced to 24 months probation.
10 September – Nirvana released their hit song "Smells Like Teen Spirit" that trailblazed grunge rock.
17 September – Rock band Guns N' Roses release their first full-length follow up to their debut album Appetite for Destruction in the form of the double album Use Your Illusion I & Use Your Illusion II. Both go on to sell a combined excess of 1.3 million on their first week of sale in the US alone.
23 September
Primal Scream releases Screamadelica, the album would go on to win the first Mercury Prize in 1992. 
The TV Series Baywatch begins the second season with a new theme song performed and co-written by former Survivor member Jimi Jamison, "I'm Always Here".
Bryan Adams releases his sixth album Waking up the Neighbours produced by Mutt Lange, achieving diamond status in his native Canada for the second time.
24 September – Seattle-based band Nirvana release their second album Nevermind, that in the beginning of 1992 replaces Michael Jackson's album Dangerous at number one on the Billboard charts. Nevermind would then make the Grunge movement explode and become one of the most famous rock albums of all time. It is considered the emblem of the Generation X. Blood Sugar Sex Magik, the Red Hot Chili Peppers album, was also released on this date, as well as the hip-hop group A Tribe Called Quest also released their second album, The Low End Theory, on this day. Soundgarden releases their breakout album Badmotorfinger.

October–December
3 November – A free tribute concert is held at Golden Gate Park in memory of concert promoter Bill Graham, killed in a helicopter crash three weeks earlier at the age of 60. Performers include Santana, Grateful Dead, Journey and Crosby, Stills, Nash & Young.
7 November
Bryan Adams's 16-week stay at the top of the UK Singles Chart with "Everything I Do (I Do It For You)" is finally ended by U2 single "The Fly", having already set a new record for the longest consecutive stay at the top of the UK Singles Chart.
Izzy Stradlin quits Guns N' Roses.
Frank Zappa's children, Dweezil and Moon, announce to an audience in New York that their father is unable to attend the tribute concert to his music because he is seriously ill with prostate cancer.
14 November – The new Michael Jackson music video "Black or White" premieres simultaneously in 27 countries to an audience of 500 million people. Controversy is immediately generated by the video's last four minutes in which Jackson smashes windows, vandalizes a car and causes a building to explode, as well as suggestively grabs his crotch repeatedly while dancing.
19 November 
U2 releases album Achtung Baby.
Luis Miguel releases Romance which revitalized the popularity of boleros in the 1990s. 
24 November – Freddie Mercury, lead singer of Queen, dies from AIDS-related complications at the age of 45 one day after making the disease public. The same day, Eric Carr, formerly of KISS, also dies from complications of heart cancer.
26 November – Michael Jackson releases his worldwide hit album Dangerous. It comes four years after Bad and goes on to sell more than 32 million copies worldwide. 
30 November – Following in the steps of the Billboard 200, the Billboard Hot 100 also begins a new era by incorporating and merging electronically measured sales and airplay data from SoundScan and BDS respectively.
1 December 
A Carnegie Hall Christmas Concert, featuring Kathleen Battle and Frederica von Stade, a jazz band led by Wynton Marsalis, and orchestra and chorus conducted by André Previn, is recorded for television.
George Harrison plays Yokohama, Japan. The brief Japanese tour with Eric Clapton marks his first set of formal concert performances since 1974.
4 December – The Judds give their final concert performance as a duo.
31 December – The twentieth annual New Year's Rockin' Eve special airs on ABC, with appearances by Boyz II Men, Simply Red, Vanessa L. Williams, Another Bad Creation, Restless Heart, Michael Bivins and Barry Manilow.

Also in 1991
Aerosmith signs a new deal with Sony Music worth an estimated $30 million.
The Rolling Stones sign a new contract with Virgin Records.
Country music legend Kenny Rogers starts his restaurant chain, Kenny Rogers Roasters.
Tupac Shakur's solo career begins with his first album, 2Pacalypse Now. Six-year-old Qa'id Walker-Teal is shot dead by a stray bullet during a confrontation between Tupac's entourage and a rival group.
Mangue Bit is originated in Recife, Brazil, circa 1991.

Bands formed 
See Musical groups established in 1991

Bands disbanded 
See Musical groups disestablished in 1991

Bands reformed 
The Knack
Procol Harum

Albums released

January–March

April–June

July–September

October–December

Release date unknown

85–86 – Dag Nasty
30 Something – Carter USM 
Addicted to Jesus - Carman
Alice in Wonderland No. 1 - Randy Greif
Alice in Wonderland No. 2 - Randy Greif
Alice in Wonderland No. 3 - Randy Greif
All True Man – Alexander O'Neal
Amen – Salif Keita 
Angst – Lacrimosa
Architect of Fear – Raven
Artistic Vice - Daniel Johnston
Baby Animals – Baby Animals (debut)
BBC Radio 1 Live in Concert – Hawkwind
Bluesiana II - Dr. John
 Boomerang - Mad at the WorldCadillac Rag - John HartfordChagall Guevara – Chagall Guevara Civil Rites –  REZ The Beast Inside – Inspiral Carpets Coming Down – Daniel AshBelieving in Better – Lennie GallantThe Best of Spandau Ballet – Spandau BalletThe Big Wheel – RunrigBorder Drive-In Theatre – The RaindogsBoys Will Be Boyz – NewsboysBy Heart – Brenda K. StarrClown Heaven and Hell (EP) – Me Mom and MorgentalerThe Commitments – Various Artists (soundtrack)Daisychain Reaction - Poster ChildrenDay By Day - E. T. MensahDaniela Mercury – Daniela MercuryA Different Kind of Weather – The Dream AcademyDon't Fear the Reaper (EP) – Clint Ruin and Lydia LunchDistant Plastic Trees – The Magnetic FieldsDu ciment sous les plaines – Noir DésirEarly On (1964–1966) – David BowieEggnog (EP) – MelvinsElectric Barnyard – The Kentucky HeadhuntersElla Returns to Berlin – Ella FitzgeraldFire and Love – GuardianThe First of Too Many – Senseless ThingsFis Fis Tziganes - Okay TemizFoxbase Alpha – Saint EtienneFreaks - X Marks the PedwalkGhosts - Techno AnimalGirly Sound – Liz PhairGirlsville - Thee HeadcoateesGo Figure – Spirit of the West Good Woman - Gladys KnightHangover (Бодун) - AuktyonHammerbox – HammerboxHartford & Hartford - John Hartford & Jamie HartfordHavana 3am – Havana 3amHarmony Ranch – Riders in the Sky Hung Far Low – The Honeymoon KillersI Scream Sunday – One Bad PigI'm on Your Side – Jennifer HollidayIndustrial – PitchshifterInformation Libre – Sham 69Inside Out – Idle CureIsland – HÖH and Current 93It's... Madness Too – MadnessJahmekya – Ziggy MarleyJah Won't Pay the Bills – SublimeKinetic Faith -  BrideKrov za krov – AriaLife 'n Perspectives of a Genuine Crossover - Urban Dance SquadLife's Too Short – Marshall CrenshawLove's Secret Domain – CoilLunar Womb – The ObsessedMagia – ShakiraMagnetic Dance - Okay TemizMilestone - The TemptationsMr. Lucky – John Lee HookerThe Nymphs – The NymphsOn the Way Down from the Moon Palace – Lisa GermanoThe Only Solution: Another Revolution – The Fatima MansionsOpen Doors, Closed Windows – Disco InfernoOphelia's Shadow – ToyahOrbital – OrbitalOut for the Count – Show of HandsOut of the Grey – Out of the GreyPage of Life – Jon and VangelisParadise Lost – Cirith UngolPalace Springs – HawkwindPop Pop – Rickie Lee JonesThe Promise – T'PauQui sème le vent récolte le tempo – MC SolaarRansom - RansomRevolution Girl Style Now! – Bikini KillRise of the Common Woodpile - Caroliner Rainbow Open Wound ChoraleRock, Stock, and Barrel - AngelicaThe Sadness of Things - Steven Stapleton & David TibetSan Antorium – LowlifeSexplosion! – My Life with the Thrill Kill KultShakill's Warrior - David MurraySilver Lining – Nils LofgrenSoul Show: Live at Delta 88 – Joan Osborne (live)Soul Survivor – Ken TamplinSpirit Electricity (EP) – Bad BrainsStars Crash Down – Hue and CryStranger in This Town – Richie SamboraStruck by Lightning – Graham ParkerSuit suit...hehehe – SlankSurprise – Crystal WatersTen Stories - Rick EliasThemes and Dreams – The Shadows (compilation)Tossing Seeds – SuperchunkTotal Castration - Zeni GevaUnsane – UnsaneUnseen Worlds - Laurie SpiegelVoices – Kenny ThomasVolume One – SleepWar Master – Bolt ThrowerWelcome to Love - Pharoah SandersWatershed – Grant McLennan Wonder Wheel – Speed the PloughWorld on a String – Red AllenWorld Outside – The Psychedelic Furs

 Biggest hit singles 
The following songs achieved the highest chart positions
in the charts of 1991.

Top 40 Chart hit singles

Other Chart hit singles

Notable singles

Other Notable singles

Top best albums of the year
All albums have been named albums of the year for their hits in the charts.
'
 Nirvana – Nevermind Pearl Jam – Ten My Bloody Valentine – Loveless U2 – Achtung Baby Red Hot Chili Peppers – Blood Sugar Sex Magik Metallica – Metallica Primal Scream – Screamadelica Slint – Spiderland A Tribe Called Quest – The Low End Theory Massive Attack – Blue Lines Talk Talk – Laughing Stock Published popular music 
 "Dreamland" w. Alan Bergman & Marilyn Bergman m. Dave Grusin
 "Look Around" w. Betty Comden & Adolph Green m. Cy Coleman from the musical The Will Rogers Follies"Moja domovina"

 Classical music 
John Corigliano – Symphony No. 1
George Crumb – Easter Dawning for carillon
Mario Davidovsky – Simple Dances for flute, two percussion, piano, and cello
Joël-François Durand – un feu distinct for flute, clarinet, piano, violin and cello
Lorenzo Ferrero
Concerto for Piano and OrchestraParodia, for chamber ensembleZaubermarsch, for small orchestra
Sofia GubaidulinaGerade und ungerade (Чет и нечет) for seven percussionists, including cymbalomSilenzio for bayan, violin, and cello
Angelo GilardinoMusica per l'Angelo della Melancholia, for guitarVariazioni sulla Fortuna, for guitar
Karel GoeyvaertsOpbouw (Construction), for orchestraDe Zang van Aquarius, version for symphony orchestra
Jan Klusák – Stesk po MozartoviUlrich Leyendecker – Symphony No. 3
Witold Lutosławski – Chantefleurs et ChantefablesPehr Henrik NordgrenGoing On for double bass and percussion, Op. 77Odotus (Awaiting) for male choir, Op. 78Cronaca for string orchestra, Op. 79Streams for chamber orchestra, Op. 80
Kaija Saariaho – ...à la FuméeJohn Serry Sr. –
 A Savior Is Born, for organ and voice
 Dreams Trilogy, for piano
 La Culebra, for solo flute
Karlheinz Stockhausen –Elufa, for flute and basset horn, with electronic music ad lib., 9. ex Nr. 64Freia, for flute ex 9 Nr. 64
Joan Tower – Concerto for Orchestra
Takashi YoshimatsuSagittarius Ecologue for bassoon and harp
Symphony No. 2 "at Terra" for orchestraFuzzy Bird Sonata for saxophone and piano3 White Landscapes for flute, bassoon, and harpWind Color Vector for Guitar

 Opera 
John Adams – The Death of Klinghoffer, first performance on 19 March at the Théatre Royal de la Monnaie, Brussels, Belgium
Harrison Birtwistle – Gawain, first performance on 30 May at the Royal Opera House, London
Daniel Catán – Rappaccini’s Daughter (La hija de Rappaccini)
John Corigliano – The Ghosts of VersaillesMeredith Monk – Atlas Jazz 

 Musical theater 
 Miss Saigon (Claude-Michel Schönberg and Alain Boublil) – Broadway production opened at the Broadway Theatre on 11 April and ran for 4097 performances
 The Secret Garden – Broadway production opened at the St. James Theatre on 25 April and ran for 706 performances
 Song of Singapore – off-Broadway production opened at the Irving Plaza on 7 May and ran for 459 performances
 Will Rogers Follies – Broadway production opened at the Palace Theatre on 1 May and ran for 983 performances

 Musical films 
 Beauty and the Beast (animated feature)
 The Commitments The Five Heartbeats For the Boys Kilukkam Stepping Out Stones at the Max El Acompañamiento Thalapathi Births 
8 January
Asuka Hinoi Japanese singer
Shin Ji-min, South Korean singer and rapper
9 January – 3LAU, American DJ and producer
12 January – Pixie Lott, British singer, songwriter and actress
13 January – Goo Hara, Member of Kara, Korean singer (d. 2019)
14 January – Cat Torres, Australian singer-songwriter, musician, contestant on The Voice Australia
23 January – Torres (musician), American independent singer, songwriter, musician and artist
28 January – C.J. Harris, American singer (D.2023) 
1 February – Martha Heredia, Dominican singer
7 February – Gabbie Hanna, American rapper, singer, musician, comedienne and author
8 February – Nam Woo-hyun, South Korean singer, dancer, and actor
10 February
Ceng De Ping, Taiwanese singer
Emma Roberts, American actress and singer
11 February – Never Shout Never (Christofer Ingle), American musician
12 February – Casey Abrams, American singer-songwriter and guitarist
14 February – Karol G, Colombian singer-songwriter
15 February - Maruv, Ukrainian singer-songwriter, record producer 
17 February – Ed Sheeran, British singer-songwriter and businessmen (worked with Taylor Swift, Anne-Marie, Nina Nesbitt, Camila Cabello, Tori Kelly, Kasey Chambers, Stormzy, Cardi B and Maisie Peters)
11 February – Allday, Australian musician, rapper, singer-songwriter (The Veronicas, Troye Sivan)
21 February –  William Bowery, British musician, producer and songwriter on Folklore and Evermore and Midnights by Taylor Swift
24 February – Tyler Bryant, American rock musician (Tyler Bryant & the Shakedown, Dead Cool Dropouts, Lisa Origliasso, The Veronicas)
26 February
CL (singer), South Korean singer/songwriter/rapper
Lee Chang-sub, South Korean singer
6 March – Tyler, The Creator, American rapper and record producer
8 March – Devon Werkheiser, American actor and musician
10 March – Kenshi Yonezu, Japanese musician, singer-songwriter and record producer
11 March
Chingiz Mustafayev, Azerbaijani singer-songwriter and guitarist
Qian Lin, Chinese singer
13 March – Luan Santana, Brazilian singer-songwriter
16 March – Wolfgang Van Halen, American bassist
25 March
Liang Bo, Chinese singer-songwriter
Kevin Garrett, American musician, worked with Alessia Cara
March 26 – Ari Lennox, American R&B singer
March 27 - London on da Track,  American record producer, rapper, and songwriter (Summer Walker) 
28 March
Amy Bruckner, American actress and singer
Hoya, South Korean singer and actor
29 March – Irene, South Korean singer and actress (Red Velvet)
30 March – NF, American rapper
2 April – Quavo, American rapper and frontman of hip-hop trio Migos
3 April – Hayley Kiyoko, American singer, songwriter, advocate and dancer
4 April
Lucas Lucco, Brazilian singer-songwriter
Jamie Lynn Spears, American comedienne, singer and actress
7 April – Anne-Marie, British singer songwriter, dancer, activist, and musician
8 April – Andrea Ross, American singer and actress
10 April – Amanda Michalka (AJ), American singer-songwriter, musician and actress
15 April – Daiki Arioka, Japanese singer (Hey! Say! JUMP)
18 April – Joey Gaydos, American actor and guitarist
27 April – Eric Fukusaki, Peruvian singer based in Japan
30 April – Lindsay Pearce, American singer and actress
10 May – Ray Dalton, American singer-songwriter
12 May – Jennifer Damiano, American actress and singer
15 May – Jed Elliott, British bassist (The Struts)
16 May = Joey Graceffa, American YouTuber, vlogger, actor, author, producer and musician. 
17 May
Daniel Curtis Lee, American actor and rapper
DJ Akademiks, Jamaican Hip Hop blogger
Adil Omar, Pakistani rapper and producer
18 May – Spellling, American singer
19 May – Jordan Pruitt, American singer
20 May – Bastian Baker, Swiss singer, songwriter, and performer
22 May
Brooke Simpson, American singer-songwriter
Suho, South Korean singer (EXO)
23 May – Lena Meyer-Landrut, German singer-songwriter and dancer
24 May – Erika Umeda, Japanese singer
25 May – Guy Lawrence of EDM House garage band, Disclosure 
26 May
Amber Bondin, Maltese singer
Channel Tres, American singer, songwriter, rapper and record producer
27 May – Channii, Dutch singer-songwriter
29 May
Kristen Alderson, American actress and singer
Matoma, Norwegian DJ and record producer
31 May – Azealia Banks, American rapper, singer and songwriter
7 June – Fetty Wap American rapper
12 June – Jessie Reyez, Colombian-Canadian singer-songwriter
14 June – Jesy Nelson, English singer-songwriter, dancer and former member of Little Mix, now solo.
16 June
Lim Young-woong, South Korean trot singer
Joe McElderry, British singer
17 June – Shura, British singer-songwriter, musician and producer
20 June – Hannah Diamond, British singer-songwriter and visual artist
23 June – Katie Armiger, American singer
24 June – Max Ehrich, American singer, actor and dancer
28 June – Seohyun, member of South Korean pop girl group Girls' Generation
29 June – Caleidra, British singer-songwriter
30 June – MC Davo, Mexican rapper, singer and composer
1 July – Sanah Moidutty, Indian singer songwriter
5 July – Sam Fischer, Australian songwriter, singer, producer and musician (Demi Lovato)
7 July – Alesso, Swedish producer and DJ
9 July
Mitchel Musso, American actor and musician
Clara Hagman, Former Ace of Base member and singer
Adrianne Lenker, American musicist
10 July
María Chacón, Mexican actress and singer
Angel Haze, American rapper and singer-songwriter
12 July – Dexter Roberts, American singer
15 July – Yuki Kashiwagi, Japanese idol singing group member
16 July – Emma Louise, Australian indie-pop singer-songwriter
17 July – Mann, American rapper
18 July – Karina Pasian, American Russian multi lingual classical musician and singer
21 July – Lucy Spraggan, British musician
26 July – Nathan Hartono, Singaporean singer and actor
29 July – Miki Ishikawa, American actress and singer
30 July
David Carreira, Portuguese singer, model and actor
Diana Vickers, British singer
31 July – Abhay Jodhpurkar, Indian singer
1 August - Kelsy Karter, New zealand singer-songwriter 
9 August
Candela Vetrano, Argentine actress, singer and model
Heize, South Korean singer, rapper, and songwriter
13 August – Dave Days, American singer-songwriter and guitarist
21 August
Tess Gaerthé, Dutch singer and actress
Jesse Rutherford, American singer and musician
26 August – Alok, Brazilian DJ and record producer
30 August – Guru Randhawa, Indian singer, songwriter and music composer
3 September – Moneybagg Yo, American rapper
8 September – Nicole Dollanganger, Canadian singer, songwriter, activist and artist (Lana Del Rey, Grimes)
9 September – Hunter Hayes, American country singer
11 September – Kygo, Norwegian producer and DJ
12 September – Imri Ziv, Israeli singer-songwriter
15 September – Alex Florea, Romanian singer
16 September – Noname, American singer-songwriter, rapper, musician & poet
22 September – Chelsea Tavares, American actress and singer
23 September – Key, South Korean singer and actor
September 26 – Ant Clemons, American singer, rapper, songwriter
1 October – Via Vallen, Indonesian dangdut singer
4 October
Nicolai Kielstrup, Danish singer
Leigh-Anne Pinnock, English singer-songwriter, dancer, activist, philanthropist, and member of Little Mix
5 October – Betty Who, Australian singer-songwriter
7 October – Lay Zhang, Chinese singer-songwriter, record producer, director and dancer (EXO)
10 October
Gabriella Cilmi, Australian-Italian blues and pop singer-songwriter
Lali Espósito, Argentine actress, singer, dancer, model, and songwriter
17 October – Brenda Asnicar, Argentine actress and singer
18 October – Tyler Posey, American musician and actor
29 October – Parris Goebel, New Zealand-born choreographer, dancer, singer, director and actress
31 October – Jordan-Claire Green, American actress and musician
5 November – Flume (musician), Australian record producer, musician and DJ
8 November – Riker Lynch, American actor, singer and bassist
11 November – Emma Blackery British singer-songwriter, musician, comedienne, entertainer and YouTuber (sometime: beauty blogger, Gaming blogger) 
13 November – Matt Bennett, American actor and singer (Victorious'', Ariana Grande)
14 November – Gallant, American musician
18 November – Tommy Cash, Estonian rapper
22 November – Saki Shimizu, Japanese singer
23 November –  Harley "Kicks" Alexander-Sule of Rizzle Kicks, and sometimes working under the name:  Jimi Charles Moody
25 November – Kevin Woo, American-South Korean singer and dancer (U-KISS and Xing)
28 November – Hannah Diamond, English singer-songwriter, photographer, musician, producer and visual artist. (Charli XCX, A G Cook)
2 December
Charlie Puth, American singer, musician, songwriter and record producer
Ainsley Melham, Australian singer, dancer and actor
7 December – Dori Sakurada, Japanese actor and singer
9 December – PnB Rock, American hip hop recording artist (d. 2022)
11 December – Anna Bergendahl Swedish Irish singer
13 December
Jay Greenberg, American composer
Dermot Kennedy – Irish singer-songwriter and musician
14 December
Offset, American rapper and member of hip-hop trio Migos
Stefflon Don, British-Jamaican rapper, singer and songwriter
15 December – Alana Haim, Alana Mychal Haim, American guitarist, singer, keyboardist, musician and actress (member of band Haim)
19 December
Tom Walker (singer), Scottish singer-songwriter (Zara Larsson, Dodie)
Jack River, Australian singer-songwriter, musician and producer
19 December
Declan Galbraith, British singer
Keiynan Lonsdale, Australian actor, dancer and singer-songwriter
22 December – DaBaby, American rapper
23 December – YoungstaCPT, South African rapper
24 December – Louis Tomlinson, English singer, songwriter and television personality. (British singer in the band One Direction)
27 December – Chloe Bridges, American actress, singer and pianist 
30 December – Tyler Carter, American singer, rapper and songwriter (Issues, Woe Is Me)
Unknown – DallasK, American music producer and songwriter

Deaths 
1 January – Buck Ram, American singer and songwriter (The Platters), 83
6 January – Ahmed Adnan Saygun, Turkish composer and musicologist, 83
8 January – Steve Clark, guitarist of Def Leppard, 30 (overdose of codeine)
14 January – Chitragupta, film composer, 73
20 January – Stan Szelest American keyboard player (The Band), 47
6 February – Danny Thomas, singer and actor, 79
9 February – James Cleveland, gospel singer, 59
13 February – Flaviano Labò, operatic tenor, 64
17 February – Gitta Alpár, operatic soprano, 88
20 February – Isabelle Delorme, pianist, composer and music teacher, 90
21 February – Margot Fonteyn, ballerina, 71
26 February – Slim Gaillard, jazz musician, 75
2 March – Serge Gainsbourg, singer and songwriter, 62 (heart attack)
13 March – Jimmy McPartland, 83, jazz musician
14 March
Jerome Doc Pomus, songwriter, 65
Howard Ashman, lyricist, 40 (AIDS-related)
15 March – Bud Freeman, jazz musician, 84
18 March – Dezider Kardoš, Slovak composer, 76
21 March – Leo Fender, inventor of the electric guitar, 81
25 March – Eileen Joyce, pianist, 83
1 April – Martha Graham, 96, American dancer and choreographer
4 April – Louis Guglielmi, 75, French composer
7 April
Henry Glover, American songwriter, producer and trumpet player, 69
Ruth Page, American dancer and choreographer, 92
8 April – Per Yngve Ohlin, aka 'Dead', vocalist of Mayhem, 22 (suicide)
13 April – Wilhelm Lanzky-Otto, horn virtuoso, 82
17 April – Jack Yellen, 98, American lyricist
18 April – Barry Rogers, 55, American jazz and salsa trombonist
20 April – Steve Marriott, singer, songwriter and guitarist (Small Faces and Humble Pie), 44 (killed in house fire)
21 April – Willi Boskovsky, conductor, 81
23 April – Johnny Thunders, rock guitarist and singer, 38 (drug-related)
26 April
Leo Arnaud, composer, 86
Carmine Coppola, flautist and composer, 80
28 April  – Ken Curtis, American singer and actor, 74
29 April – Gonzaguinha, Brazilian singer and composer, 45 (car accident)
3 May – Mohammed Abdel Wahab, Egyptian singer and composer (b. 1907)
8 May
Jean Langlais, composer, 84
Rudolf Serkin, pianist, 88
9 May? – Yanka Dyagileva, poet and singer, 24 (drowned)
19 May – Odia Coates, singer, 49 (breast cancer)
23 May – Wilhelm Kempff, pianist and composer, 95
24 May
 Dirk Schoufs, a member of Belgian Band Vaya Con Dios (AIDS-related)
Gene Clark, singer-songwriter (The Byrds), 46 (heart attack)
27 May – Leopold Nowak, musicologist, 86
1 June – David Ruffin, singer (The Temptations), 50 (overdose of cocaine)
4 June – MC Trouble, rapper, 20 (epileptic seizure)
6 June – Stan Getz, US saxophonist, 64
9 June – Claudio Arrau, pianist, 88
14 June – Joy Finzi, founder of the Finzi Trust, 84
6 July  – Herminio Giménez, composer, 86
11 July  – Honorata de la Rama, singer, 89
15 July – Bert Convy, American game show host, actor, and singer, 57 (brain tumor)
28 August – Vince Taylor, rock and roll singer, 52 (cancer)
4 September
Charlie Barnet, US bandleader, 77
Dottie West, American country singer, 58 (car accident)
8 September – Alex North, composer, 80
17 September
Zino Francescatti, violinist, 89
Rob Tyner, lead singer of MC5, 46 (heart attack)
20 September – Tom Anderson, Shetland fiddler
25 September – Sydney MacEwan, singer of traditional Scottish and Irish songs, 82
28 September
Miles Davis, jazz trumpeter and composer, 65 (stroke)
Eugène Bozza, composer, 86
6 October – Igor Talkov, Russian singer/songwriter, 34 (murdered)
9 October – Roy Black, 48, singer and actor (heart failure)
16 October – Ole Beich, guitarist and bassist, 36 (drowned)
17 October – Tennessee Ernie Ford, country musician, 72
25 October – Bill Graham, rock concert promoter, 60 (helicopter crash)
27 October – Sir Andrzej Panufnik, Polish composer, 75
31 October 
Joseph Papp, Broadway producer, 70
Garvin Bushell, multi-instrumentalist
2 November – Mort Shuman, songwriter, 54 (complications following a liver operation)
3 November – Chris Bender, R&B singer, 19 (murdered)
8 November – Frances Faye, singer, 79
11 November – Morton Stevens, film composer, 62
15 November – Jacques Morali, disco composer, 44 (AIDS)
24 November
Freddie Mercury, singer, 45 (AIDS)
Eric Carr, drummer, 41 (cancer)
10 December – Headman Shabalala, member of Ladysmith Black Mambazo, 46 (shot)
13 December – Stuart Challender, conductor, 44 (AIDS-related)
22 December – Édouard Woolley, tenor, actor, composer and music educator

Awards 
Country Music Hall of Fame Inductees: Felice and Boudleaux Bryant
Rock and Roll Hall of Fame Inductees: LaVern Baker, The Byrds, John Lee Hooker, The Impressions, Wilson Pickett, Jimmy Reed and Ike and Tina Turner
1991 Country Music Association Awards
1991 Grammy Awards
1991 MTV Video Music Awards
Eurovision Song Contest 1991
Kumar Sanu – Filmfare Best Male Playback Award
33rd Japan Record Awards

See also
 1991 in music (UK)
 Record labels established in 1991

References

 
20th century in music
Music by year